London—Fanshawe is a provincial electoral district in Ontario, Canada, that has been represented in the Legislative Assembly of Ontario since 1999.

Geography
The district consists of the southeast part of the city of London.

Specifically, it consists of the part of the city lying east and north of a line drawn from the northern limit of the city south along Highbury Avenue North, west along the Thames River (South Branch), south along the Canadian National Railway, west along Commissioners Road East, south along Wharncliffe Road South, east along Southdale Road East, south along White Oak Road, east along Exeter Road, north along Meg Drive, west along Jalna Boulevard, north along Ernest Avenue, east along Bradley Avenue, north along Highbury Avenue South, east along Arran Place and Bradley Avenue to the eastern limit of the city.

History

The riding was created in 1996 from parts of London Centre and Middlesex. It consisted initially of the part of the City of London lying east and north of a line drawn from the northern limit of the city south along Highbury Avenue and Highway 126, west along the Thames River, south along the Canadian National Railway tracks, west along Commissioners Road East, south along Wharncliffe Road South, east along Southdale Road East, south along White Oak Road, east along Exeter Road, north along Meg Drive, west along Jalna Boulevard, north along Ernest Avenue, east along Bradley Avenue, north along the Highbury Avenue, east along Arran Place and Bradley Avenue to the eastern limit of the city.

In 2003, it was given its current boundaries as described above.

The provincial electoral district was created in 1999 when provincial ridings were defined to have the same borders as federal ridings.

Members of Provincial Parliament

This riding has elected the following members of the Legislative Assembly of Ontario:

Election results

2007 electoral reform referendum

Sources

Elections Ontario Past Election Results

External links
 London-Fanshawe Provincial Liberal Association
 Map of riding for 2018 election

Ontario provincial electoral districts
Politics of London, Ontario